Bernard Boverton Redwood (28 November 1874 – 28 September 1911) was a British motorboat racer who competed in the 1908 Summer Olympics.

As crew member of the Gyrinus he won two gold medals in the only motor boat competitions at the Olympics.
His father was Sir Thomas Boverton Redwood, 1st Baronet.

Notes

External links 
 profile

1874 births
1911 deaths
British motorboat racers
English Olympic medallists
Olympic motorboat racers of Great Britain
Motorboat racers at the 1908 Summer Olympics
Olympic gold medallists for Great Britain
Medalists at the 1908 Summer Olympics